The Uteck Bowl is one of the two semifinal bowls of U Sports football, Canada's national competition for university teams that play Canadian football. It is held in the easternmost of the two semifinal venues. The Uteck Bowl champion moves on to face the Mitchell Bowl champion for the Vanier Cup. It was named for Larry Uteck, a former professional football player and university coach who died of amyotrophic lateral sclerosis (ALS) in 2002.

History
The Atlantic Bowl traditionally saw the Atlantic University Sport champions face a champion from another conference at Huskies Stadium in Halifax. However, in the interests of competitive fairness, the Atlantic Bowl was replaced by the Mitchell Bowl, its venue, like the Churchill Bowl that had paralleled it for so long, rotating among two of the conference champions.

Larry Uteck was a longtime football coach at Saint Mary's University and, at the time, the university's athletic director.  It was decided that the Churchill Bowl would be retired, the Mitchell Bowl would take the place of the Churchill Bowl, and a new championship would be named in Uteck's memory. Thus, the Uteck Bowl formally replaced the Atlantic Bowl.

The inaugural Uteck Bowl was played at Huskies Stadium, where two-time defending Vanier Cup champions and home team Saint Mary's Huskies defeated the Simon Fraser Clan.

The 2020 game was cancelled due to the COVID-19 pandemic.

Uteck Bowl champions

Future participants
The teams and host sites of the Uteck Bowl and the Mitchell Bowl rotate on a six-year cycle, so that in each cycle each of the four conferences hosts and visits every other conference once. With the 2020 game cancelled, the cycle was delayed by one year with the 2020 teams playing in 2021.

The participants and sites for future Uteck Bowl games are listed below:

To date, the Uteck Bowl games hosted by Quebec have been played at the champion's home field, while the first four games hosted by Atlantic University Sport (AUS) were played at Huskies Stadium in Halifax. The 2011 game was held in Moncton at the newly built Moncton Stadium. All subsequent games were hosted by the Loney Bowl champion. As of 2022, home teams have a record of 10–9.

Team win–loss records

References

External links
 Uteck Bowl history

Sport in Halifax, Nova Scotia
U Sports football trophies and awards